Encinedo, Encinéu in Leonese language, is a municipality located in the province of León, Cabreira shire, Spain. According to the 2010 census (INE), the municipality has a population of 870 inhabitants.

Language
Leonese language is widely spoken in this municipality.

See also
 León (province)
 Leonese language
 Cabreira
 Kingdom of León

References

Municipalities in the Province of León